The Bandini formula junior is a racing car produced from 1959 to 1962 by the Bandini Automobili company of Forlì, Italy.

Overview
The Formula junior was a promotional category created in Europe and in the United States to introduce young drivers to the racing career, allowing the best a well-deserved visibility even beyond national borders.

For this reason, the technical regulations limited the design and the operating costs. In an attempt to reduce differences between cars, the engines had to come from standard cars manufactured in large numbers. Limited interventions were allowed. The choice of Bandini, and many other car manufacturers was the Fiat . The most noticeable changes to the engine concerned particular carburetor ducts, changes to the head, a new oil pan, and timings that brought the maximum power up to 90 HP @6900 rpm. For better weight distribution, and to provide space for the steering column, the engine was placed in the center of the body and tilted 15° lengthwise.                                                                          The steering gear could thus be in an optimal position to avoid bump and roll steer phenomena.
The formula junior race cars were prepared in the new headquarters in Via Bertini and most of them were exported to America through Biener of New York. The famous American driver, team manager, and entrepreneur. Roger Penske, among others, made one of his first races on one of these cars.

The chassis 

A chassis was specifically designed and manufactured for this car by the Bandini company combining round and elliptical cross-section elements. For the first time, the De Dion rear suspension system was applied on a Bandini, with the adoption, in some cases, of a Watt linkage as well. The front suspension, on the other hand, is an independent double-wishbone system, with the possibility to quickly vary the camber. The steering adopts an anti-Ackermann solution.

The multi-link independent rear wheels solution, another novelty, was tested on one model, with an anti-roll bar, hydraulic telescopic shock absorbers, and inclined coaxial cylindrical coil springs.

The quick-change gear differential introduced for the Formula Tre was used also on the junior formula, for the same purposes but with a new casting attached to the frame. This also made it possible to adjust the characteristic angles of the rear axle. Structure and material: tube frame with elliptical and round cross-sections, in special steel derived from the aeronautics sector;

 Suspension:
Front: independent double-wishbone system with stabilizer bar, adjustable camber;
Rear: De Dion rigid bridge with hydraulic telescopic vertical shock-absorbers and cylindrical helical coaxial springs; in the model with independent wheels: lower triangle with multi-link, hydraulic telescopic inclined shock-absorber bound to the hub holder  and cylindrical helical coaxial; springs with adjustable camber, caster, and toe;
 Braking system:
In-service: hydraulic, drum brakes, front 250 mm and rear 220 mm
Parking: not present
 Steering: worm gear
 Driving: single-seat, central position
 Wheels: spoked Borrani or Amadori light alloy or Campagnolo 12-13-14 in
 Fuel tank: 
 Drive train: central differential unit in an inverted position, gear-box with quick-change of ratios (6 ratios available) and semi-axles with homokinetic joints at the rear
 Overall weight: 
 Maximum speed: 
 Wheelbase 
 Track:
 Front: 
 Back: 
 Length:

The engine

The Fiat  engine is tilted 15° along the longitudinal axis, allowing its positioning at the center of the body for better weight distribution.

 Positioning: front longitudinal, 4 cylinders in-line inclined by 15°.
 Bore: 
 Stroke: 
 Volume: 1089.5 cc
 Compression ratio: 9.8:1 
 Fuel feed: 2 Weber double-barrel carburetors 38DCOE / 40DCOEPower: 2 carburettors Weber 38DCOE body double / 40DCOE
 Output:  @ 6900 rpm
 Lubrication:wet sump with gear pump
 Cooling: forced liquid with centrifugal pump, cooler on the front
 Gearbox and clutch: Fiat 4 Gears + RG, dry single disc clutch
 Start-up and electrical system: coil and distributor-breaker on the floor plan, 12V battery

The body

The aluminum single-seater body built by Bandini has simple lines, in full "Formula One" style of the period.

The front part, in the various models, is always low and brings the air necessary for cooling through a large rectangular chamfered or semicircular opening. Conversely, the tail, which has a lower flap to access the differential, is high, voluminous, and rounded.

Both parts are attached to the frame with screws, while the engine hood, which reaches the pilot's seat, is fixed with two quick-release restraints. Two side air intakes with horizontal elements allow the vent of hot air; on the engine hood instead, there's the fresh air intake for the carburetors.

See also
 Ilario Bandini
 Bandini Cars

References

Bandini vehicles
Formula Junior cars
1960s cars
Sports cars
Cars introduced in 1959